Frédéric Fontang (born 18 March 1970) is a former professional tennis player from France. He is now a tennis coach.

Career
A successful junior, Fontang won the Petits As in 1984 and was the French 16s champion in 1986.

Fontang had his best year on tour in 1991 when he reached two ATP Tour finals. He was runner-up in the San Marino Open and won a tournament in Palermo.

The following year he reached the quarter-finals at Palermo and was also a quarter-finalist in the Estoril Open. At these tournaments he had wins over three top 40 players, Franco Davín, Javier Sánchez and Fabrice Santoro.

Fontang took part in seven French Opens but didn't register a win until his final attempt, in 1997, when he defeated Patrik Fredriksson in the opening round.

He later became coach of Jérémy Chardy and remained with him for 12 years. During this time Chardy won the 2005 Wimbledon Championships Boys' Singles title, won ATP 250 title in Stuttgart and reached the fourth round of the French Open the next year. Fontang is the current coach of Felix Auger-Aliassime.

Coaching history of Frederic Fontang :

- coach of Caroline Garcia from March 2011 to June 2012. 
Final US Open Juniors and semi Final at French open Juniors

- coach of Vasek Pospisil from October 2012 until August 2016.  
from no 140 to no 25 ATP singles ranking and career high in doubles no 4

- coach of Felix Auger-Aliassime from Jan 2017 until now. 
semi final masters 1000 Miami
10 finals on ATP TOUR 
best ranking so far no 6

ATP career finals

Singles: 2 (1–1)

Challenger titles

Singles: (1)

References

External links
 
 

1970 births
Living people
French male tennis players
French tennis coaches
Sportspeople from Casablanca